The Martin's toadlet (Uperoleia martini) is a species of frog in the family Myobatrachidae.
It is endemic to south-eastern Australia.

References

Uperoleia
Amphibians of New South Wales
Amphibians of Victoria (Australia)
Taxonomy articles created by Polbot
Amphibians described in 1986
Frogs of Australia